Bernardo Glacier is one of the largest glaciers in the Southern Patagonian Ice Field. It is located northeast of Témpano Glacier, within Bernardo O'Higgins National Park in Chile. The glacier flows westward Bernardo Fjord.

References

Glaciers of Aysén Region